Dresden is the capital city of the German Federal Free State of Saxony.

Dresden may also refer to:

Places

United States 
Dresden, Kansas, city
Dresden, Maine, town
Dresden, Missouri, unincorporated community
Dresden, Perry County, Missouri, abandoned village
Dresden, Washington County, New York, a town
Dresden, Yates County, New York, a village
Dresden, North Dakota, unincorporated community
Dresden, Ohio, village
Dresden Plant, a natural gas power plant in Ohio
Dresden, Tennessee, town
Dresden Generating Station, a nuclear power plant in Illinois

Other places 
Dresden, Ontario, Canada
Dresden (region), Free State of Saxony, Germany
Dresden, Staffordshire, England

Media
 Dresden (1946 film), a 1946 East-German film
 Dresden (2006 film), a 2006 television film directed by Roland Suso Richter
 Dresden (album), a 2009 album by Jan Garbarek
 Drezden (band), a Belarusian electronic band founded by Siarhei Mikhalok
 "Dresden", a 2013 song by Orchestral Manoeuvres in the Dark from the album English Electric

People
 Arnold Dresden (1882–1954), Dutch-American mathematician
 Dave Dresden (born 1969), progressive house DJ from San Francisco and one half of DJ duo Gabriel & Dresden
 Harry Dresden, a character in The Dresden Files series
 Max Dresden (1918–1997), Dutch-American theoretical physicist and historian of physics

Vessels
SMS Dresden (1907), a German light cruiser, scuttled in 1915
SMS Dresden (1917), a German light cruiser, scuttled in 1919
USS Zeppelin (1914), renamed Dresden in 1927
SS Dresden, a list of ships

Other uses
 Dresden Codex, a Mayan astrology book
Dresden Porcelain, a porcelain factory in Freital, near Dresden
 Dresden, a term sometimes used to mean European porcelain
 Dresden United F.C. an English football club, active in the 1890s
 A 1939 meteorite fall in Ontario, Canada